Kish was a royal yacht of the Shah of Iran named after Kish Island. It sailed in the Persian Gulf, in contrast to the bigger but older yacht Chahsevar that was in the Caspian Sea.

Kish was completed in 1970 by Yacht and Bootswerft, West Germany. After the Iranian Revolution, she was reportedly refitted in Bandar Abbas and then used as a training ship. Her fate is unknown although she may be a yacht abandoned on the Raritan River, New Jersey for many years (coordinates of its location 40.4845149, -74.3923997).

Description 
She had a navigation radar working on I-band.

References 

 
 

1970 ships
Ships built in Germany
Royal and presidential yachts
Training ships
Iran–Iraq War naval ships of Iran
Pahlavi dynasty